is a Japanese football player. He plays for Fujieda MYFC.

Career
Hiroki Waki joined Amitie SC Kyoto in 2015. In 2016, he moved to J3 League club Fujieda MYFC.

Club statistics
Updated to 23 February 2017.

References

External links

1993 births
Living people
Osaka Gakuin University alumni
Association football people from Osaka Prefecture
Japanese footballers
J3 League players
Ococias Kyoto AC players
Fujieda MYFC players
Association football forwards